The 1964 Federation Cup was the second edition of what is now known as the Fed Cup. 20 nations participated in the tournament, which was held at the Germantown Cricket Club in Philadelphia, Pennsylvania, United States, from 1–5 September. Australia won the title, defeating defending champions United States in the final.

Participating teams

Draw
All ties were played at the Germantown Cricket Club in Philadelphia, Pennsylvania, United States on grass courts.

First round
France vs. Switzerland

Austria vs. Netherlands

Czechoslovakia vs. Mexico

South Africa vs. Japan

Second round
Australia vs. Denmark

Canada vs. Sweden

West Germany vs. Italy

France vs. Netherlands

Czechoslovakia vs. South Africa

Norway vs. Great Britain

Belgium vs. Argentina

Ireland vs. United States

Quarterfinals
Australia vs. Canada

West Germany vs. France

South Africa vs. Great Britain

Argentina vs. United States

Semifinals
Australia vs. France

United States vs. Great Britain

Final
Australia vs. United States

References

Billie Jean King Cups by year
Federation Cup
Federation Cup
Federation Cup
Federation Cup
Federation Cup
Federation Cup
Federation Cup
September 1964 sports events in the United States